Movies of the Mind is a live album from Michael Nesmith. The album documents Nesmith's 2013 2-month tour of the United States.

According to Nesmith, the songs played on the album touched a chronological and thematic history of Nesmith's solo music. He stated, "I picked my favorites to play, the ones I have come to love over the years, and the ones that are most requested by fans of my solo work."

The album was available directly through Nesmith's website "Videoranch". A Super Deluxe Edition, which featured a vinyl LP record, two CDs, and a signed Certificate of Authenticity, was limited to 200 pressings. Side one of the vinyl LP featured studio recordings of recent Nesmith songs, planned for release on an upcoming album, "Around the Sun". These tracks were previously available for download on "Videoranch" in MP3 form.  Side two of the LP included 2013 live tracks, including Nesmith's first composition, "Papa Gene's Blues", which was featured on the album The Monkees.  The Deluxe Edition included two CDs (one signed by Nesmith) with live versions of the songs "Calico Girlfriend" ("Calico Girlfriend Samba"), "Nine Times Blue", "Little Red Rider", "Propinquity", "Some of Shelly's Blues", and "Listen to the Band" were originally recorded with The Monkees (although "Listen to the Band" was the only track of the six to be released, which was on the album The Monkees Present).

Track listings

Deluxe Edition
All songs by Michael Nesmith.
"Welcome and Band Introductions"
"Calico Girlfriend"
"Nine Times Blue"
"Little Red Rider"
"Propinquity (I've Just Begun to Care)"
"Tomorrow and Me" 
"Different Drum"
"Some of Shelly's Blues"
"Joanne"
"Silver Moon"
"Rio"
"Casablanca Moon"
"Yellow Butterfly"
"Light"
"Rays"
"Cruisin'" 
"Dance"
"Tonight"
"Grand Ennui"
"Rising in Love"
"Listen to the Band"

Vinyl only Super Deluxe Edition
All songs by Michael Nesmith.
Only Understanding Love
I Know What I Know
Love Is the Place
Life Is Long
Smiles of Autumn
Papa Gene's Blues
Life, the Unsuspecting Captive
Marie's Theme
Lamp Post
Laugh Kills Lonesome
Thanx for the Ride

Personnel
Michael Nesmith – vocals, guitar
Chris Scruggs – lead, slide and pedal steel guitars
Paul Leim - drums, percussion, Ableton
Joe Chemay - bass, background vocals, Ableton
Boh Cooper - keys, background vocals, Ableton
Red Rhodes - pedal steel guitar on "Thanx For the Ride" (via a posthumous multitrack recording)

Michael Nesmith albums
2014 live albums